Angelo Caimo (born July 14, 1914) was an Italian professional football player.

Honours
 Serie A champion: 1939/40.

1914 births
Year of death missing
Italian footballers
Serie A players
Novara F.C. players
Inter Milan players
Association football goalkeepers